Blackpool Sands is a gravel beach near Dartmouth, Devon, England named after the nearby village of Blackpool. It has been increasingly encroached on each year since 1933. In 1989 the sea broke the defences, severely damaging seaside properties and threatening the A379 road.

Amenities
There is a charge for parking in the high season, a cafe and a shop. The beach is stony rather than sandy, and therefore not suitable for younger children or the building of sandcastles.

See also
 Battle of Blackpool Sands

External links
http://www.blackpoolsands.co.uk

Beaches of Devon
Dartmouth, Devon
Stoke Fleming